Bliznets is a stratovolcano in central Kamchatka. The volcano is situated on the crest of the central Sredinny Range south-west of Kebeney volcano.

See also
List of volcanoes in Russia

References

Volcanoes of the Kamchatka Peninsula
Mountains of the Kamchatka Peninsula
Stratovolcanoes of Russia
Pleistocene stratovolcanoes
Pleistocene Asia